Henry Walton Grinnell (November 19, 1843 – September 2, 1920), known as Walton Grinnell, was a naval veteran of the American Civil War and the Spanish–American War. He became a rear admiral and Inspector-General in the Imperial Japanese Navy and served at the battle of the Yalu River in the Sino-Japanese War of 1894–95. He was discharged as an admiral at the end of the war.

Walton Grinnell's elder sister Sylvia (born 1838) married William Fitzherbert Ruxton (born 1830) who became an admiral in the British Royal Navy.

Henry Grinnell, father of Sylvia and Walton, was a partner in Grinnell, Minturn & Co., owners of the Swallowtail shipping line which included Flying Cloud, in 1851 the fastest clipper ship in the world. He financed an expedition to discover the fate of Sir John Franklin who was lost while searching for the Northwest Passage, and the Grinnell Peninsula on Devon Island is named after him.

See also 
 Foreign government advisors in Meiji Japan

References 
 The Royal Navy in Polar Exploration from Franklin to Scott, E C Coleman, 2006 (Tempus Publishing)

1843 births
1920 deaths
American expatriates in Japan
American businesspeople in shipping
Foreign advisors to the government in Meiji-period Japan
Winthrop family

19th-century American businesspeople